M. aurea  may refer to:
 Millettia aurea, a legume species found only in Madagascar
 Miomantis aurea, a praying mantis species

See also
 Aurea (disambiguation)